The Diane Linkletter Story is a 1970 16mm short film by American filmmaker John Waters starring Divine, Mary Vivian Pearce, and David Lochary.

Overview
This improvised film is based on the 1969 suicide of TV personality Art Linkletter's daughter, Diane. In the film, Mr. and Mrs. Linkletter fret about their daughter's recent behavior, which includes taking drugs and dating a lowlife named Jim. Eventually, the parents confront Diane, which results in her suicide under the influence of LSD. Waters claims that the film is "accidental" – he and his friends improvised a story while testing a new synch-sound camera (later used on Multiple Maniacs). The film had a very limited release in the early 1970s, mainly in art houses as short feature before Pink Flamingos, and gained a wider audience when it showed up on a 1990 videotape entitled A Divine Double Feature.

Cast
 Divine as Diane Linkletter
 David Lochary as Art Linkletter
 Mary Vivian Pearce as Lois Foerster Linkletter

Background
John Waters stated in a 2015 interview with the British Film Institute that the short is the worst of his works, but that the Diane Linkletter Story was ad libbed and was really just a test of the camera the day it was filmed.

See also
 List of American films of 1970

References

External links
 

1970 films
1970 comedy films
American satirical films
American black-and-white films
1970 independent films
Comedy films based on actual events
Films directed by John Waters
American independent films
1970 short films
American comedy short films
1970s satirical films
1970s English-language films
1970s American films